Ecco noi per esempio ("here's us, for example") is a 1977 Italian comedy film directed by Sergio Corbucci. It was the first movie starring the comedian-star duo composed of Adriano Celentano and Renato Pozzetto. It is mostly set in Milan.

Cast 
 Adriano Celentano: Antonmatteo Colombo aka Click 
 Renato Pozzetto: Palmambrogio Guanziroli
 Barbara Bach: Ludovica 
 Giuliana Calandra Beatrice
 Capucine: Mariarosa Colombo, former wife of Click 
 Antonio Casagrande: Commissioner of Police 
 Felice Andreasi: the publisher 
 Georges Wilson: Melano Melani 
 Elio Crovetto: the newsagent
 Franca Marzi: Carmen, the landlady 
 Imma Piro: Vincenzina, girlfriend of Click 
 Sal Borgese  horse thief
 Ugo Bologna: Gianni  
 Walter Valdi: friend of Click 
 Carmen Russo: dancer at the disco

References

External links

1977 films
Italian comedy films
1977 comedy films
Films directed by Sergio Corbucci
Films set in Milan
1970s Italian films